Pra Liga Futsal Timor-Leste is the top league for futsal in East Timor. It is organized by East Timor Futsal Association which in under the auspices of East Timor Football Federation.

List of champions

References

External links
Pra Liga Futsal Timor-Leste on Facebook

Futsal leagues in East Timor
Futsal competitions in East Timor
East Timor
2020 establishments in East Timor
Sports leagues established in 2020
Futsal